Rukhiyet Palace  is a palace in the capital city of Asgabat in Turkmenistan. The palace holds official state events, forums, meetings, and inaugurations. The palace was built by the French company Bouygues.

References

Palaces in Turkmenistan
Tourist attractions in Ashgabat
Buildings_and_structures_in_Ashgabat
Event venues established in 1999